Foughala District is a district of Biskra Province, Algeria.

Municipalities
The district has 2 municipalities:
Foughala
El Ghrous

References

Districts of Biskra Province